George Grimes Watson (13 October 1927 – 2 August 2013) was a scholar, literary critic, historian, a fellow of St John's College, and professor of English at Cambridge University.

Early life 
Watson was born in Brisbane, Australia, on 13 October 1927.  He was educated at Brisbane Boys' College and the University of Queensland, where he graduated in English in 1948. He secured a scholarship for a second degree and graduated in English from Trinity College at Oxford University in 1950.

Career 
A talented linguist, he worked for the European Commission, both as an interpreter and checking  its publications. Watson became a lecturer of English at Cambridge University in 1959 and  a Fellow of St John's College in 1961.

Watson met C. S. Lewis at Oxford's Socratic Club in 1948 and attended his lectures. Later, he counted him among his finest professors and, after Watson joined Cambridge, among his colleagues. Among Watson's English students at St John's was Douglas Adams.

Politics and views 
Watson was an active member of the Liberal Party, and he was a member of Liberal Party co-ownership committee from 1951 to 1957. He stood in Cheltenham in the 1959 United Kingdom general election. In the 1979 European Parliament election in the United Kingdom, he fought the Leicester European Parliament constituency. He was senior treasurer of the Cambridge University Liberal Club from 1978 to 1992. In his will, Watson left £950,000 to the Liberal Democrats and the painting Rocky Landscape with Saint John the Baptist by Joos de Momper to the National Gallery, London.

Watson contributed to Encounter, a Cold-War intellectual journal, and published material arguing that Adolf Hitler was a Marxist and that socialism promoted genocide. He was featured in the film The Soviet Story in 2008, where he argued that Karl Marx was responsible for coming up with the idea of genocide. For this, he was criticised by Ivars Ījabs and Robert Grant, who argue that Watson's views are based on mistranslation and distortion reflecting his ideological bias. The translation of Völkerabfälle as "racial trash" lay at the centre of this, with defenders of Marx and Friedrich Engels saying that a proper translation would be "residual fragments of peoples".

In the Lost Literature of Socialism (1998), Watson cited an 1849 article written by Engels called "The Hungarian Struggle" and published in Marx's journal Neue Rheinische Zeitung, stating that the writings of Engels and others show that "the Marxist theory of history required and demanded genocide for reasons implicit in its claim that feudalism, which in advanced nations was already giving place to capitalism, must in its turn be superseded by socialism. Entire nations would be left behind after a workers' revolution, feudal remnants in a socialist age, and since they could not advance two steps at a time, they would have to be killed. They were racial trash, as Engels called them, and fit only for the dung-heap of history." Watson's claims have been criticised by Robert Grant for "dubious" evidence, arguing that "what Marx and Engels are calling for is ... at the very least a kind of cultural genocide; but it is not obvious, at least from Watson's citations, that actual mass killing, rather than (to use their phraseology) mere 'absorption' or 'assimilation', is in question." Talking about Engels' 1849 article and citing Watson's book, historian Andrzej Walicki wrote: "It is difficult to deny that this was an outright call for genocide."

In the 2008 documentary film The Soviet Story, Watson stated at minute 16:37 that Engels is "the ancestor of the modern political genocide." While confirming the use of the term Völkerabfälle in Marx's daily newspaper to describe several small European ethnic groups, Latvian political scientist and cultural commentator Ivars Ijabs responded: "To present Karl Marx as the 'progenitor of modern genocide' is simply to lie."

Works

Books 
Watson's works, many of them reprinted, in the Library of Congress include:
 Cambridge Bibliography of English Literature, Vols. 1–5 (1969–1977)
 Unservile State, essays in liberty and welfare (1957)
 Concise Cambridge Bibliography of English Literature (1958)
 British Constitution and Europe (1959)
  "Dryden :'Of Dramatic Poesy' and other critical essays " 2vols (1962)
 Literary Critics, a study of English descriptive criticism (1962)
 Literary Critics, a study of English descriptive criticism (1964)
 Concise Cambridge Bibliography of English Literature, 600–1950 (1965)
 Coleridge the Poet (1966)
 Is Socialism Left? (1967, 1972)
 Study of Literature (1968)
 New Cambridge Bibliography of English Literature, edited by George Watson (1969)
 Literary English since Shakespeare, edited by George Watson (1970)
 The English Ideology, studies in the language of Victorian politics (1973)
 Literary Critics, a study of English descriptive criticism (1973, 1986)
 Politics and Literature in Modern Britain (1977)
 The Discipline of English: A Guide to Critical Theory and Practice (1978, 1979)
 Castle Rackrent by Maria Edgeworth, edited with an introduction by George Watson (1980, 1995, 2008)
 Shorter New Cambridge Bibliography of English Literature (1981)
 Idea of Liberalism: Studies for A New Map of Politics (1985)
 Writing a Thesis: A Guide to Long Essays and Dissertations (1987)
 Certainty of Literature: Essays in Polemic (1989)
 Biographia Literaria, or, Biographical Sketches of My Literary Life and Opinions by Samuel Taylor Coleridge, edited and with an introduction by George Watson (1991)
 Critical Essays on C.S. Lewis, edited by George Watson (1992)
 Lord Acton's History of Liberty, a study of his library, with an edited text of his History of Liberty Notes (1994)
 Lost Literature of Socialism (1998, 2002, 2010)
 Never Ones for Theory?: England and the War of Ideas (2002)
 Take Back the Past: Myths of the Twentieth Century (2007)

Articles 
 "Were the Intellectuals Duped?", Encounter (December 1973)
 "Millar or Marx?", The Wilson Quarterly (Winter 1993)
 "The Messiah of Modernism: F. R. Leavis (1895–1978)", The Hudson Review, Vol. 50, No. 2 (Summer 1997), pp. 227-241.
 "Hitler and the Socialist Dream", The Independent (November 1998)
 "Remembering Prufrock:  Hugh Sykes Davies 1909–1984", Jacket (Fall 2001)

References

Notes

External links 
 

1927 births
2013 deaths
Alumni of Trinity College, Oxford
British classical liberals
British literary critics
Fellows of St John's College, Cambridge
Liberal Party (UK) parliamentary candidates
Literary critics of English
People from Brisbane
People educated at Brisbane Boys' College
University of Queensland alumni